Edith D. Warren is a former Democratic member of the North Carolina General Assembly, representing the state's eighth House district from 1999 until 2012. Her district included all of Martin County and part of Pitt County.

Warren is a retired educator from Farmville, North Carolina.

External links
North Carolina General Assembly - Representative Edith D. Warren official NC House website
Project Vote Smart - Representative Edith D. Warren (NC) profile
Follow the Money - Edith D. Warren
2008 2006 2004 2002 2000 1998 campaign contributions
Oral History Interview with Edith Warren from Oral Histories of the American South

East Carolina University alumni
Members of the North Carolina House of Representatives
Living people
1937 births
Women state legislators in North Carolina
People from Farmville, North Carolina
Businesspeople from North Carolina
Educators from North Carolina
American women educators
21st-century American politicians
21st-century American women politicians